The Fear Woman is a lost 1919 American silent drama film produced and distributed by Goldwyn Pictures and starring Pauline Frederick.

Some of the filming took place in Berkeley, California.

Plot
As described in a film magazine, because her father warns her that alcoholism is a trait that has been inherited by the Winthrops over four generations, Helen Winthrop (Frederick) breaks her engagement to Robert Craig (Sills) for fear of bringing children into the world that are predisposed to drunkenness. They separate and Helen visits Stella Scarr (Travers), an old friend. When Stella foolishly deceives her husband Sidney (Northrup), Helen shields her and is disgraced. Percy Farwell (Hiers), newly rich, becomes enamored of her, and his mother (Titus) hires Robert to break up their supposed affair. Helen feigns drunkenness at the betrothal dinner and is able to prove Robert's love for her. They then resume their engagement.

Cast
Pauline Frederick as Helen Winthrop
Milton Sills as Robert Craig
Walter Hiers as Percy Farwell
Emmett King as Harrison Winthrop
Harry Northrup as Sidney Scarr (credited as Harry S. Northrup)
Ernest Pasque as Bruce Terhune
Beverly Travers as Stella Scarr
Lydia Yeamans Titus as Mrs. Honorah Farwell

References

External links

Seal, John, "The Fear Woman: Made in Berkeley, but where?", Burkeleyside Oct. 25, 2011 (film still)

1919 films
American silent feature films
Lost American films
Goldwyn Pictures films
1919 drama films
American black-and-white films
1919 lost films
Lost drama films
1910s American films